Tomaszew may refer to the following places:
Tomaszew, Koło County in Greater Poland Voivodeship (west-central Poland)
Tomaszew, Konin County in Greater Poland Voivodeship (west-central Poland)
Tomaszew, Masovian Voivodeship (east-central Poland)